The 1913 Franklin & Marshall football team was an American football team that represented Franklin & Marshall College during the 1913 college football season. The team compiled a 6–2 record and outscored opponents by a total of 208 to 54. 

Charles Mayser, a successful preparatory coach, was hired as the school's head coach in 1913. Upon arriving, he promised: "I am going to put the F. and M. on the athletic map in letters big and bold."

Schedule

References

Franklin and Marshall
Franklin & Marshall Diplomats football seasons
Franklin and Marshall football